Denise Breitburg is an American marine ecologist specializing in the effects of deoxygenation on marine systems and organisms such as oysters and jellyfish. She is Principal Investigator, and Senior Scientist, at the Smithsonian Environmental Research Center (SERC).

Career 

She received a B.S. in biology from Arizona State University and an M.A. in Biology and Ph.D. in biology from the University of California at Santa Barbara. She is adjunct professor at University of Maryland, College Park.

Breitburg has made a specialty of studying the "dead zones" that occur in fresh water, and particularly in the Chesapeake Bay.
She has studied sustainable oyster harvesting, and the impact of non-native species.  Her lab is currently studying effects of low dissolved oxygen on interactions and distributions of Chesapeake Bay organisms, potential effects of oyster decline and restoration on the Chesapeake Bay food web, how multiple stressors related to human activities influence coastal systems, how the complexity of food webs influences responses of coastal systems to stress, how links among regions of the estuarine landscape influence gelatinous zooplankton population dynamics, and how to improve oyster restoration.

References

External links 
official website 

American ecologists
Women ecologists
American women scientists
Living people
Year of birth missing (living people)
Smithsonian Institution people
Arizona State University alumni
University of California, Santa Barbara alumni
21st-century American women